Mount Gilead is a village and the county seat of Morrow County, Ohio, United States.

It is located 41 miles (66 km) northeast of Columbus. The population was 3,660 at the 2010 census. It is the center of population of Ohio. The village was established in 1832, eight years after white settlers arrived in the region. Before their arrival, the forest was a hunting area for the Shawnee tribe.

Located in the center of the village is Morrow County's historic World War I Victory Memorial Shaft, unique in the United States, and Mount Gilead State Park is nearby on State Route 95. Other areas drawing tourism include the Amish farms, shops and stores east of Mount Gilead, near Chesterville and Johnsville. Mount Gilead is also home to the Morrow County Hospital.

History

19th century

Settlement
The first settler to make Mount Gilead (Mt. Gilead) home was Lewis Hardenbrook, in 1817, though it was then called Whetstone and was located in Marion County. In 1824, Judge Jacob Young drew out the village; the plan consisting of 80 lots and also included a public square. Several years later, in 1832, Henry Ustick added an additional 70 lots to the village as well as an additional public square. The original public square was then referred to as the south square and the newer square, the north square. Many years later, in 1919, the north public square would become home to the Victory Shaft World War I Monument. This monument was given to the county for having the highest per capita war bond sales during a two-year period.  Charles Webster built the first cabin in the village in December 1824. He served as the first Postmaster and operated the Post Office from the cabin, as well.  In 1832, a measure was proposed to change the name of the town. Residents were asked to vote between the names Warsaw and Mt. Gilead. Mt. Gilead was chosen by a significant margin and the village was incorporated by state legislature several years later in 1839.

In 1848, Mt. Gilead was almost unanimously chosen to be the county seat for the newly formed Morrow County, Ohio. Morrow County was formed from parts of surrounding Marion, Knox, Richland, and Delaware counties. Given the village's elevated status as the county seat, village leaders enhanced many areas of the town's appearance by creating streets and clearing them and performed other improvements.

Railroad
Soon after being named county seat, there was talk of building a rail line that would pass through Mt. Gilead between Cleveland and Columbus. Officials opened stock purchases and began preparations for the build. Tensions between villagers and railroad officials broke down the negotiations and the rail station was re-located to Cardington, several miles south of Mt. Gilead, and opened for business in 1851. The railroad would pass Mt. Gilead two miles to the west, in what is now known as Edison. Nearly 30 years later, Mt. Gilead did get a rail spur through the village, named Mt. Gilead Short Line Railway. The Short Line opened in 1880.

Industry
From its beginnings, industry has been a main support for Mt. Gilead. Various mills were an early staple in the village history, followed by a tile factory and with technological advances, eventually the still well known Hydraulic Press Manufacturing Company or HPM. HPM maintained some level of operations in Mt. Gilead until 2011, when it was moved to Marion.

Media
Mt. Gilead had two media sources available to them in the 19th century, Democratic Messenger and The Whig Sentinel. Both papers began publishing in 1848 and both papers experienced a name change around 1860 with The Sentinel becoming The Morrow County Sentinel and The Messenger becoming The Union Register. The Union Register was published until 1971, while the Morrow County Sentinel is still in existence today.

Historic sites
Four properties in Mount Gilead are listed on the National Register of Historic Places: the floral hall at the county fairgrounds, Levering Hall, the Morrow County Courthouse, and the James S. Trimble House.  Levering Hall in particular is distinguished by its ornate Italianate architecture and its place as the center of community life for several decades.

The Victory Shaft was erected in Mount Gilead's town square in December 1919, following World War I. It was presented as a gift from the federal government to Morrow County citizens to thank them for purchasing more war bonds per capita than any other county. Warren G. Harding, a Senator who would later be elected President, was the keynote speaker at the dedication.

Geography
Mount Gilead is located at  (40.552090, -82.831587).  Its elevation is 1,081 feet above sea level.

Mount Gilead is considered to be a part of "Mid Ohio."

Demographics

2010 census
As of the census of 2010, there were 3,660 people, 1,482 households, and 875 families residing in the village. The racial makeup of the village was 97.1% White, 0.1% Native American, 0.2% Asian, 0.3% from other races, and 2.0% from two or more races. Hispanic or Latino of any race were 1.9% of the population.

There were 1,482 households, of which 32.4% had children under the age of 18 living with them, 40.7% were married couples living together, 13.0% had a female householder with no husband present, 5.3% had a male householder with no wife present, and 41.0% were non-families. 35.0% of all households were made up of individuals, and 16.6% had someone living alone who was 65 years of age or older. The average household size was 2.34 and the average family size was 3.01.

The median age in the village was 36.9 years. 24.5% of residents were under the age of 18; 9.7% were between the ages of 18 and 24; 25.5% were from 25 to 44; 22.9% were from 45 to 64; and 17.3% were 65 years of age or older. The gender makeup of the village was 47.3% male and 52.7% female.

2000 census
As of the census of 2000, there were 3,290 people, 1,291 households, and 843 families residing in the village. The population density was 1,035.7 people per square mile (399.5/km2). There were 1,354 housing units at an average density of 426.3 per square mile (164.4/km2). The racial makeup of the village was 97.78% White, 0.12% Native American, 0.24% Asian, 0.30% from other races, 1.06% Black, and 0.49% from two or more races. Hispanic or Latino of any race were 1.03% of the population.

There were 1,291 households, out of which 31.6% had children under the age of 18 living with them, 50.8% were married couples living together, 10.6% had a female householder with no husband present, and 34.7% were non-families. 31.1% of all households were made up of individuals, and 18.1% had someone living alone who was 65 years of age or older. The average household size was 2.35 and the average family size was 2.91.

In the village, the population was spread out, with 24.0% under the age of 18, 8.4% from 18 to 24, 28.3% from 25 to 44, 20.5% from 45 to 64, and 18.8% who were 65 years of age or older. The median age was 38 years. For every 100 females, there were 90.5 males. For every 100 females age 18 and over, there were 90.0 males.

The median income for a household in the village was $31,894, and the median income for a family was $42,529. Males had a median income of $35,714 versus $22,425 for females. The per capita income for the village was $19,064. About 10.1% of families and 13.2% of the population were below the poverty line, including 18.1% of those under age 18 and 16.4% of those age 65 or over.

19th-century census data
According to A.J. Baughman's History of Morrow County, Ohio (1911), early population data is as follows:

Government

Mount Gilead is governed by a mayor and council.  As of 2021, the mayor was Jamie L. Brucker.

Education
The city has a public lending library, the Mount Gilead Public Library.

Notable people

Tim Belcher - former Major League Baseball player (Born in Mt Gilead however he grew up in Sparta, OH.)
Oswald Bruce Cooper — graphic designer
Claude Dallas — self-styled mountain man convicted of involuntary manslaughter, later escaped from prison.
C.B. Dollaway — professional mixed martial arts fighter
Frank K. Dunn - Chief Justice of the Illinois Supreme Court
Merrill Gilfillan — author
William Vermillion Houston — president of Rice University
Robert Byington Mitchell — soldier and governor of New Mexico
Walter Olds — Justice of the Indiana Supreme Court
Edwin Taylor Pollock — United States Navy Captain, Governor of U.S. Virgin Islands and American Samoa
Dawn Powell — satirical author
Samuel Snider — U.S. Representative from Minnesota
Lefty Webb — baseball player for the Pittsburgh Pirates
Samuel Newitt Wood — Kansas state legislator

References

External links
 Village website
 

 
Populated places established in 1824
1824 establishments in Ohio
County seats in Ohio
Villages in Morrow County, Ohio
Villages in Ohio